Whitefish Bay 33A is a First Nations reserve on Lake of the Woods near Sioux Narrows-Nestor Falls in northwestern Ontario. It is one of three reserves of the Northwest Angle 33 First Nation.

References

Saulteaux reserves in Ontario
Communities in Kenora District